Fantasy Masterworks is a series of British paperbacks intended to comprise "some of the greatest, most original, and most influential fantasy ever written", and claimed by its publisher Millennium (an imprint of Victor Gollancz) to be "the books which, along with Tolkien, Peake and others, shaped modern fantasy."

It has a companion series in the SF Masterworks line. A separate Future Classics line has also started featuring eight science fiction novels from the last few decades.

The books were numbered only through No. 50; in the 2013 reboot of the series, the books are unnumbered, have a uniform look, and feature introductions by well-known writers and critics.

Numbered paperback series (2000–2007)

New design 

* Also published in the Fantasy Masterworks numbered series.

See also
 SF Masterworks

References

External links 
 List of Fantasy Masterworks in order of publication with extensive reviews.
 Fantasy Masterworks overview and reviews—List of Fantasy Masterworks numbered series in reverse order of publication with shorter reviews at The SF Site.
 The Fantasy Masterworks List—A graphical presentation of the Fantasy Masterworks.

Fantasy books by series
Lists of fantasy books